Kyrkja is a mountain in Lom Municipality in Innlandet county, Norway. The mountain is surrounded by several other notable mountains including Urdadalstindene and Semelholstinden to the east; Kyrkjeoksli, Visbretinden, and Langvasshøi to the southeast; Høgvagltindene to the south; Stehøi and Stetinden to the west; and Tverrbottindene and Tverrbytthornet to the north.

The mountain is named  which means "The Church". This name was given because its peak is extremely steep and resembles a church spire. 

Kyrkja was not thought to be climbable until the 19th-century, due to its steepness. Despite its slopes, climbing to the top is a day’s hike, helped by the rocks covering the mountainside. Kyrkja used to be covered in snow, but climate change has severely lessened the amount of snow on the mountain.

See also
List of mountains of Norway by height

References

Jotunheimen
Lom, Norway
Mountains of Innlandet